Christiana Solomou "Solo" is a Cypriot football midfielder, who played for Sparta Prague in the Czech First Division.

Early life
Born to Nikolas and Meropi in Paphos, Cyprus. Solomou was raised with her two older brothers (Kostas and Kyriakos) and one older sister, Eleni. She began playing football at an early age with her mother and sister in a local football club, Pafia FC and her father was among her first coaches. At the age of 15 she was moved to Limassol, Cyprus and she started to play for Apollon Ladies.

Club career
2009–2013 Apollon Ladies
2013–2014 Central Connecticut State University
2014–2017 Apollon Ladies
2017–2019 Barcelona FA
2019–2020 Sparta Prague

International career
She is a member of the Cyprus national team. Solomou made her debut for the national team U19 in a match against Ukraine U19 on 19 September 2009.

FOOTBALL CAREER TRANSFERS AND STATISTICS 
We are going to show you the list of football clubs and seasons in which Christiana Solomou has played. It includes the total number of appearance (caps), substitution details, goals, yellow and red cards stats.

Honors and awards

Club
Apollon Ladies
 Cypriot First Division: 2009, 2010, 2011, 2012, 2013, 2015, 2016, 2017
  Cypriot Women's Cup: 2009, 2010, 2011, 2012, 2015, 2016, 2017
  Cypriot Women's Super Cup: 2009, 2010, 2011, 2015, 2016
Barcelona FA
  Cypriot First Division: 2018
  Cypriot Women's Cup: 2019
  Cypriot Women's Super Cup: 2018

Individual
 Best Women Football Player in Cyprus: 2010, 2011, 2012, 2015

Personal life
Solomou married football player Pambos Kairinos on 10 June 2018. They met in Limassol where they both played football.

Education
She went to the primary school named B' Primary school of Geroskipou. She continued her education at Agias Paraskeuis gymnasium. Then, she went to the high school named Giannakis Taliwtis in Geroskipou and took her degree in 2011. She moved   for a year  in United States (2013-2014) and studied exercise science at Central Connecticut State University. She came back to Cyprus and studied social work at Frederick University in Limassol and took her bachelor's degree in 2017.

References

External links
Christiana's Solomou Interview

Cypriot women's footballers
AC Sparta Praha (women) players
1993 births
People from Paphos
Central Connecticut Blue Devils women's soccer players
Central Connecticut State University alumni
Cyprus women's international footballers
Living people
Apollon Ladies F.C. players
Women's association football midfielders
Expatriate women's footballers in the Czech Republic
Czech Women's First League players
Barcelona FA players